Hunger (died 866), also known as , was the Bishop of Utrecht from 854 to 866. He is a saint of the Catholic and Eastern Orthodox Churches.

After the death of his predecessor Luidger of Utrecht, Luidger's nephew Craft was offered the seat. However, Craft, a very wealthy person, refused because he was afraid that he would attract Viking raids. Instead, Canon Hunger was appointed. At first his relations with the Vikings were peaceful, but eventually Utrecht was threatened by the Vikings, which caused the bishop and the entire clergy of Utrecht to flee to Sint Odiliënberg, near Roermond. In 858 king Lothair II made a monastery available for them. Later the bishop settled in Prüm and then in Deventer.

Hunger seems to have been a godly man who, unlike his predecessors, did not engage in nepotism. In the case of the childless marriage between Lothair II and his wife Teutberga, he defended the sanctity of their marriage on biblical and theological grounds, but to secure his succession, Lothair II repudiated his wife and married Waldrada, with whom he had a son.

Hunger died in Prüm in Germany. His feast day is 22 December.

References
 "Parole et Prière", number 66 (December 2015), page 241.

866 deaths
Bishops of Utrecht
Dutch Roman Catholic saints
Bishops in the Carolingian Empire
9th-century Christian saints
Medieval Dutch saints
Year of birth unknown
866 births
9th-century Lotharingian people